Prince Emil of Hesse and by Rhine (German: Emil Maximilian Leopold von Hessen und bei Rhein, 3 September 1790 in Darmstadt — 30 April 1856 in Baden-Baden) was the fourth son of Louis I, Grand Duke of Hesse and his wife Princess Louise of Hesse-Darmstadt.

He was a commander during Napoleonic Wars. From 1820 to 1849, Prince Emil was a member of the Hessen Parliament. He died in 1856, at the age of 65. He was buried in Altes Mausoleum, Rosenhöhe Park, Darmstadt.

References 
 Adolf von Deitenhofen: Fremde Fürsten in Habsburgs Heer 1848–1898, Im Selbstverlage, 1898, S. 89–90.
 Eckhart G. Franz (Hrsg.): Haus Hessen. Biografisches Lexikon. (=Arbeiten der Hessischen Historischen Kommission N.F., Bd. 34) Hessische Historische Kommission, Darmstadt 2012, ISBN 978-3-88443-411-6, Nr. HD 70, S. 345–346 (Eckhart G. Franz).
 Manfred Knodt:  Die Regenten von Hessen-Darmstadt. Schlapp, Darmstadt 1989, ISBN 3-87704-004-7, S. 80–82.

19th-century politicians
1790 births
1856 deaths
House of Hesse-Darmstadt
Burials at the Mausoleum for the Grand Ducal House of Hesse, Rosenhöhe (Darmstadt)
Sons of monarchs